Whitney och Elton Johansson was the 2002 edition of Sveriges Radio's Christmas Calendar.

Plot
Svenne Svennesson runs the Svenne Tower, a high-rise building which serves as the headquarters for his music company, there the recording artists also live.

Music
The music was released to CD in 2002 by the Apparat label, among contributors musicians were After Shave and Lok. The radio series was released to CD by late November 2011.

References
 

2002 radio programme debuts
2002 radio programme endings
Sveriges Radio's Christmas Calendar
2002 establishments in Sweden